Cascade Community Federal Credit Union is a credit union in Roseburg, Oregon. On December 31, 2002, the credit union was established through the merger of Dougco Schools Federal Credit Union and Western Cascade Federal Credit Union.

History
Dougco Schools opened in 1948 as a school employees credit union, and Western Cascade was established in 1958 to serve county, city and state employees.  In 1978 Kay Bjornson became the CEO of Dougco Schools FCU, and continued as CEO of CCFCU until 2005.  Gretchen Koester, previously the CEO of Western Cascade before the merger took over as the CEO until her retirement in early 2015.  At that time Robert (Bob) Dempsey was appointed President/CEO. Dempsey died in February 2019 at which time Lynn Calvert was named interim CEO and finally permanent CEO in October 2019 after a cross country search was made.

Security 
In 2009, it was reported that the credit union upgraded from an analogue security system to an internet protocol (IP) video surveillance system consisting of 34 cameras, some microphones, capturing in three megapixels color high-definition video at 15 frames per second.  The security system comes from Brondby, Denmark.

References

External links
 Official website

Credit unions based in Oregon
1948 establishments in Oregon
1958 establishments in Oregon
2002 establishments in Oregon
Banks established in 1948
Roseburg, Oregon